"King Tubby Meets Rockers Uptown" is a dub instrumental track by reggae musician Augustus Pablo, first released under the title "King Tubby Meets the Rockers Uptown" as a single in 1974 on Island Records sublabel Mango Records. It was a dub version of the Jacob Miller song "Baby I Love You So", also produced by Pablo.

Island issued it as a single again in 1975 in the US, Canada, UK and Netherlands. As "King Tubby's Meet Rockers Up-Town", it was also released in Jamaica in 1975 as the B-side of "Baby I Love You So".

With the title "King Tubby Meets Rockers Uptown", it was later included on the 1976 album King Tubbys Meets Rockers Uptown.

AllMusic claimed that the song is "widely regarded as the finest example of dub ever recorded", and it was listed as the third best song ever recorded by Mojo.

The track was featured on the reggae radio station K-Jah West in the soundtrack of the popular video game Grand Theft Auto: San Andreas, released in October 2004.

In 2021, it was listed at No. 266 on Rolling Stone's "Top 500 Greatest Songs of All Time".

References

Dub songs
Reggae songs
1974 singles
Island Records singles
1974 songs